The 2017–18 Major Arena Soccer League season is the tenth season for the league. The regular season started on October 28, 2017, and ended on March 4, 2018. Each team played a 22-game schedule. The Baltimore Blast won their third straight Ron Newman Cup Championship by defeating the Monterrey Flash 4–3 on March 25.

Standings
Final as of March 4, 2018

(Bold) Division Winner

Eastern Conference

Western Conference

2018 Ron Newman Cup

Format
The top two teams from each division qualified for the post-season. The Division Finals are a 2-game home and home series, with a 15-minute mini-game played immediately after Game 2 if the series is tied. The Conference Finals and Championship are single elimination.

Eastern Conference Playoffs

Eastern Division Final

Baltimore wins series 2–0

Central Division Final

Milwaukee wins series 2–0

Eastern Conference Final

Western Conference Playoffs

Southwest Division Final

Monterrey wins series 2–0

Pacific Division Final

San Diego wins series 2–1

Western Conference Final

Ron Newman Cup Final

Statistics

Top scorers

Awards

Individual awards

All-League First Team

All-League Second Team

All-League Third Team

All-Rookie Team

References

External links
MASL official website

 
Major Arena Soccer League
Major Arena Soccer League
Major Arena Soccer League seasons